Friedrich Waismann (21 March 18964 November 1959) was an Austrian mathematician, physicist, and philosopher.  He is best known for being a member of the Vienna Circle and one of the key theorists in logical positivism.

Biography

Born to a Jewish family in Vienna, Austria-Hungary, Waismann was educated in mathematics and physics at the University of Vienna. In 1922, he began to study philosophy under the tutelage of Moritz Schlick, the founder of the Vienna Circle. He emigrated to the United Kingdom in 1938 due to the annexation of Austria by Nazi Germany.

He was a reader in philosophy of science at the University of Cambridge from 1937 to 1939, and lecturer in philosophy of mathematics at the University of Oxford from 1939 until his death. He died in Oxford.

Relationship with Wittgenstein
Intermittently, from 1927 until 1936, Waismann had extensive conversations with Ludwig Wittgenstein about topics in philosophy of mathematics and philosophy of language. These conversations, recorded by Waismann, were published in Ludwig Wittgenstein and the Vienna Circle (1979, ed. B.F. McGuinness). Other members of the Circle (including Schlick, Rudolf Carnap, and Herbert Feigl) also spoke with Wittgenstein, but not to the extent Waismann did.

At one point in 1934, Wittgenstein and Waismann considered collaborating on a book, but these plans fell through after their philosophical differences became apparent.

Waismann later accused Wittgenstein of obscurantism because of what he considered to be his betrayal of the project of logical positivism and empirically-based explanation. Ultimately the texts for the project, written or just transcribed by Waismann, were published by Gordon Baker in 2003.

Linguistic philosophy and logical positivism
In Introduction to Mathematical Thinking: The Formation of Concepts in Modern Mathematics (1936), Waismann argued that mathematical truths are true by convention rather than being necessarily (or verifiably) true. His collected lectures, The Principles of Linguistic Philosophy (1965), and How I See Philosophy (1968, ed. R. Harré), a collection of papers, were published posthumously.

Porosity and verifiability
Waismann introduced the concept of open texture, or porosity to describe the  universal possibility of vagueness in empirical statements; it is based on Wittgenstein's Philosophical Investigations, particularly Section 80. According to the philosopher, even after measures have been taken to ensure that a statement is precise, there remains an inexhaustible source of vagueness due to an indefinite number of possibilities. Waismann's notion of vagueness is slightly different from his concept of open texture―he explained that open texture is more like the possibility of vagueness; vagueness can also be remedied so that it can be made more precise, while open texture cannot.

Open texture has been found in legal philosophy through the writings of H. L. A. Hart (see Hart's "The Concept of Law about Rule Skepticism" and Waismann's article "Verifiability"). According to Hart, vagueness constitutes a fundamental feature of legal languages. It is claimed, however, that Waismann's conceptualization has limited practical application, since it is more for the extraordinary, while Hart's view of open texture concerns the more mundane, approaching the term in the context of a particular norm.

References 

1896 births
1959 deaths
Austrian Jews
Jewish philosophers
Jewish emigrants from Austria to the United Kingdom after the Anschluss
Philosophers of language
Vienna Circle
Writers from Vienna
Fellows of the British Academy
20th-century Austrian philosophers